The London Underground network carries more than a billion passengers a year. It has one fatal accident for every 300 million journeys. Five accidents causing passenger deaths have occurred due to train operation in nearly 80 years since the London Passenger Transport Board was formed, the last being at Moorgate in 1975; other fatalities have been due to wartime and terrorist bombings and station fires.

Up to World War II

Charing Cross 

Two accidents occurred near Charing Cross (now Embankment) in 1938. The accidents on separate lines were caused by wrong-side failures of the signals due to signal linesmen's wiring errors.

On 10 March, two Northern line trains collided between Waterloo and the station, with 12 passengers suffering minor injuries.
On 17 May, two District line trains collided near the station, killing 6.

World War II

Bounds Green
On the night of 13 October 1940 a German bomb fell at Bounds Green station killing 16 people.

Balham 
On 14 October 1940, during World War II, a bomb fell in the road above Balham station, with the blast penetrating into the tunnel 9 metres below.  The water mains and sewage pipes were broken, causing flooding and the loss of 68 lives – 64 shelterers and 4 railway staff. The station and the tracks between Clapham South and Tooting Bec (then called Trinity Road, Tooting Bec) were closed until January 1941.

Bank 
On 11 January 1941 during World War II the Central line ticket hall of Bank station suffered a direct hit from a German bomb. The roadway collapsed into the subways and station concourse, killing 56 people.

The Bethnal Green crush 

On 3 March 1943 a crowd of people were entering what was to become Bethnal Green station, which was being used at the time as an air-raid shelter. An anti-aircraft battery, a few hundred yards away in Victoria Park, launched a salvo of a new type of anti-aircraft rockets, causing the crowd to surge forward. A woman tripped on the stairs causing many others to fall. Three hundred people were crushed into the stairwell, 173 died at the scene.

After World War II

Northwood crash 
On 31 December 1945, two Metropolitan line trains collided in fog on an open-air section near Northwood. The driver of the second train had passed a danger signal under the "Stop and Proceed" rule but did not see the preceding train soon enough to stop.  A fire was started by electrical arcing. 3 people were killed.

Edgware buffer stop collision 
On 27 July 1946, a Northern line train hit the buffers at Edgware.  No passengers were killed; the driver died, but it was shown that he had suffered a heart attack at the controls before the collision.  It appeared that the dead man's handle had been disabled while the train was still moving.

Stratford crash 

On 8 April 1953 two Central line trains collided in a tunnel section during disruption caused by a signal failure, killing 12 people.

Holland Park and Redbridge fires 
Two train fires occurred on the Central line in 1958 and 1960, due to electrical short circuits in the trains causing arcing.  In both cases the trains had to be evacuated in the tunnels and passengers and crew suffered from smoke inhalation. One passenger died in the Holland Park fire on 28 July 1958. There were no fatalities in the Redbridge fire on 11 August 1960.

Neasden collision 
On 23 September 1968 a northbound ballast train passed three signals at danger and collided with the rear of a stationary Bakerloo Line passenger train standing in the platform. The driver of the ballast train died before he could be released, an accompanying inspector and the train's guard were taken to hospital and survived.

Moorgate crash 

On 28 February 1975 a southbound Northern City Line train crashed into the tunnel end beyond the platform at Moorgate station. Forty-three people were killed in what was the greatest loss of life on the Underground in peacetime. As the driver was one of the initial 43 dead, the cause of the incident was never conclusively determined, and an accidental death verdict was recorded at the official inquest.

Holborn rail crash 

On 9 July 1980 a Central line train failed to stop in time after passing a signal at danger and being tripped by a train stop. The train hit another train standing in the westbound platform at Holborn. No serious injuries were caused by the accident. An inquiry concluded that the accident was caused by the motorman of the rear train failing to control his train.

Oxford Circus fire 

On 23 November 1984 a fire raged inside Oxford Circus station. It started at 9.50 p.m. in a materials store and was declared extinguished at 3 a.m. the next day. Fourteen people were treated for smoke inhalation.
The probable cause of the fire was smoker's materials being pushed through a ventilation grille into the materials store.  This ignited rags or paint thinner within the store.

Kilburn crash 
At Kilburn station on 11 December 1984, a northbound Metropolitan line train incorrectly passed a signal at danger in foggy weather. The driver reset the controls, moved forward, and was killed when the train collided with a stationary train in front.

Kensal Green collision 
At Kensal Green station on 16 October 1986, a stationary southbound Bakerloo line train at Kensal Green station was struck in the rear by a Class 313 British Rail service on the Euston to Watford Junction line "The DC line". 23 passengers were injured. The driver of the class 313 passed the protecting stop signal as though it were at caution when it only showed a 'calling on' aspect. The (apparently distracted) driver of the Class 313 observed the train stop lower at the stop signal but failed to notice that the signal had only displayed a calling on aspect. A further protecting repeater signal had been temporarily removed while a retaining wall was being removed but the preceding stop signal had been modified to show a maximum 'caution' aspect for the duration.

The accident report criticised the fact that the calling on aspect looked much the same as the yellow 'proceed at caution' aspect but for its position on the signal head.

The Euston to Watford Junction line was, at this time, signalled with an experimental system (installed in 1932–3) where a stop signal automatically changed to a calling on aspect after a 70-80 second time delay. The repeater signals, unusually, were able to show green, yellow, or red aspects but were not equipped with train stops. A driver was permitted to pass a red repeater after one minute. Although intended to overcome local signal failures, the more intensive service of the past occasionally produced the spectacle of several trains occupying the same section buffer-to-buffer. Normally, on this system, there were always at least two (and often three) red signals behind any train. Though not unique at the time of installation, the system was the sole example of its type at the time of the collision. The system has since been replaced by a Network Rail standard colour light system, work for which was actually taking place when the accident occurred.

Richmond crash 
On 18 September 1987, a District line train of London Underground D stock failed to stop in time at Richmond station. The train hit the buffers and broke an adjacent glass panel.  No serious injuries were caused by the accident.

King's Cross fire 

On 18 November 1987, a large fire broke out in King's Cross St Pancras station. Thirty-one people died, killed by the toxic fumes and extreme heat of the blaze. The fire was the result of a discarded match or cigarette igniting debris, detritus and grease beneath the wooden escalators. As a result of this, the widely ignored smoking ban was more rigorously enforced throughout the system. All of the network's wooden escalators have now been replaced, and other measures have been put in place to help prevent a repeat incident.

Gunnersbury Triangle 
On 24 April 1999, a District line train of D stock, eastbound from Richmond derailed soon after leaving Gunnersbury Station, at Gunnersbury Triangle junction points, where the line diverged from the Railtrack route of the North London line. The trailing car, DM NO 7040 derailed and ended up skewed across the track.
No one was hurt and the passengers were soon removed from the lightly loaded train. The cause was believed to have been maintenance shortcomings by Railtrack.

Chancery Lane derailment 
On 25 January 2003, a Central line train of 1992 stock derailed at Chancery Lane, injuring 32 passengers, after a motor became detached from the train. The entire line, and the Waterloo & City line (which also uses 1992 Stock trains), were closed for approximately three months whilst the cause of the failure was determined and appropriate modifications made to the trains.

Hammersmith derailment 
On 17 October 2003 the last carriage of a 6-car eastbound Piccadilly line train of 1973 stock derailed east of Hammersmith station. The cause was a broken rail. None of the 70 passengers on board were injured.

Camden Town derailment 
On 19 October 2003 the last carriage of a 6-car Northern line train of 1995 stock derailed on the approach to Camden Town station. The derailed car hit a wall and the fifth car was partially derailed. Seven passengers were injured, 6 of whom had minor injuries. The other injury was a broken femur. The cause was a poorly designed set of points. The tunnel wall was damaged, and had to be repaired.

White City derailment 
On 11 May 2004 the leading bogie of the 7th car of an 8-car Central line train of 1992 stock derailed on a set of points during the approach to White City station. None of the 150 passengers on board were injured; a normal train service was restored the next day. The cause was found to be in the design of the set of points at locations with specific characteristics and a switch rail that had been replaced the day before the accident.
 An episode of The Tube contained a segment on the accident and subsequent recovery process.

Mile End derailment 
On 5 July 2007, two cars of an eight-car westbound Central line train of 1992 stock derailed at 65 km/h between Bethnal Green and Mile End tube stations. 520 passengers were trapped below ground for two hours, until they were escorted from the derailed train by following one another along the tracks to Mile End tube station. Eight people required hospital treatment and a further thirteen were treated at the scene for minor injuries. Most of the injuries were caused while walking along the uneven surface in the tunnel. The Central line was suspended between Liverpool Street and Leytonstone until the end of the following day as a safety investigation was carried out and the derailed train was rerailed. The investigation found that the derailment was caused by a roll of fire-resistant material being blown onto the tracks from its storage place in a connecting passageway between the two tunnels. The blanket had not been adequately secured, since the workers had not realised how strong were the winds blowing through the passage.

Runaway track machine
At around 07:00 hrs on 13 August 2010, a broken-down maintenance wagon became uncoupled from the locomotive that was towing it, allowing it to roll southwards from Archway station. The runaway train reached a maximum speed of 30 mph and passed through all stops until Warren Street station where an uphill gradient caused it to come to rest. On 28 February 2013, London Underground, Tube Lines and the German company Schweerbau were each fined £100,000 at the Old Bailey for health and safety breaches.

Passenger dragged at Holborn station
At 19:00 hrs on 3 February 2014, a passenger was hospitalised after being dragged along the platform by a departing Piccadilly line train after the end of her scarf was caught in a closing door.

Ealing Broadway derailment 
On 2 March 2016, a District line train derailed just outside Ealing Broadway station due to a set of points set incorrectly. There were no injuries.

Wimbledon derailment 
At 06:58 on 6 November 2017, a South Western Railway train derailed just after it left , on the section of the track linking the South West Main Line, owned by Network Rail and the District line, owned by London Underground. Investigation found out that there was a gap between the patrolled area, and a significant stretch of track, including where the derailment occurred, was missed from inspections.

Passenger killed at Waterloo underground station
At 10:10 hrs on 26 May 2020, a passenger fell into the gap between the platform and the train from which he had just alighted.  The passenger was unable to free himself, was paralyzed by the departing train and crushed by the next train.

See also 
 Attacks on the London Underground

References 

 T. Ridley, Oxford Circus – the Fire and its Implications Mechanical Engineering Technology, Autumn 1985
 D. Fennell, Investigation into the King's Cross Underground Fire. (Appendix J) The Stationery Office Books; 
  Derailments on London Underground at Camden Town and Hammersmith (HSE)
 White City train derailment (HSE)

 
Underground accidents
London Underground accidents